Agonopterix vendettella is a moth of the family Depressariidae. It is found in France and Portugal and on Corsica and the Canary Islands.

The wingspan is 18–21 mm.

The larvae feed on Smyrnium olusatrum.

References

Moths described in 1908
Agonopterix
Moths of Europe